Alexander Joseph, Count Sulkowski (15 March 1695 – 21 May 1762) was Polish general and the progenitor of the Sułkowski noble line. He was politically active in Poland, the Polish–Lithuanian Commonwealth and in the Electorate of Saxony.

Born in Kraków, Sulkowski was a favourite protégé of king Augustus III of Poland and acted as his Minister of State in Saxony from 1733 to 1738. He was created a Count of the Holy Roman Empire in 1733, and elevated to the rank of Prince of Bielsko by Empress Maria Theresa of Austria in 1754. According to some sources, Alexander Joseph was an illegitimate son born to Elżbieta Szalewska and king Augustus II the Strong, making him Augustus III's half-brother. Elżbieta's husband, Stanisław Sułkowski, gave Alexander Joseph his last name.

On 31 October 1728, Sulkowski married Baroness Marie Franciszka von Stain zu Jettingen. They had eight children. In 1743, he married Countess Anna Przebendowska (25 July 17211795), with whom he had four children. Sulkowski died 21 May 1762, aged 67, in Leszno, Poland.

Notable purchases

In 1738, Sulkowski purchased the Leszczyński estates of Rydzyna and neighboring areas, not far from Leszno. In 1752, he purchased the Sułkowski Castle in Bielsko-Biała (in Cieszyn Silesia) and its surroundings together with goods for 600,000 florins from Jan Sunnegh.

Sulkowski commissioned a large and exquisite Meissen porcelain service, made between 1735 and 1738 by famed sculptor Johann Joachim Kändler. Many of the porcelain pieces featured his personal monograph and coat of arms.

References

See also 
Osier pattern
Rydzyna Castle

1695 births
1762 deaths
18th-century Polish–Lithuanian politicians
18th-century Polish–Lithuanian Commonwealth people
Counts of Poland
Generals of the Polish–Lithuanian Commonwealth
Ministers-President of Saxony
Polish Counts of the Holy Roman Empire
Polish heraldry
Polish Princes of the Holy Roman Empire
Political office-holders in Saxony
Politicians from Kraków
Saxon generals
Alexander Joseph